The 1988 NCAA Division I Men's Ice Hockey Tournament was the culmination of the 1987–88 NCAA Division I men's ice hockey season, the 41st such tournament in NCAA history. It was held between March 18 and April 2, 1988, and concluded with Lake Superior State defeating St. Lawrence 4-3 in overtime. All first-round and quarterfinals matchups were held at home team venues with the 'Frozen Four' games being played at the Olympic Center in Lake Placid, New York.

For the first time the NCAA tournament was expanded to 12 teams (four more than the previous seven years) partially as a result of an increasing number of programs as well as two additional conferences being created in the interim.

This was the first tournament to include an independent school since 1960, more than a year before the ECAC was founded.

The championship game is remembered for a missed infraction towards the end of regulation that should have given St. Lawrence a penalty shot but resulted in no call from the official.

Qualifying teams
The NCAA permitted 12 teams to qualify for the tournament and divided its qualifiers into two regions (East and West). Each of the tournament champions from the four Division I conferences (CCHA, ECAC, Hockey East and WCHA) received automatic invitations into the tournament with At-large bids making up the remaining 8 teams. The NCAA permitted one Independent team to participate in the tournament and placed it in the western bracket with the intention to place an additional independent in the eastern regional in 1989. As a result, the two western conferences (WCHA and CCHA) would split only three open spots as opposed to the East's four open spots.

Format
The tournament featured four rounds of play. The three odd-number ranked teams from one region were placed into a bracket with the three even-number ranked teams of the other region. The teams were then seeded according to their ranking with the top two teams in each bracket receiving byes into the quarterfinals. In the first round the third and sixth seeds and the fourth and fifth seeds played two-game aggregate series to determine which school advanced to the Quarterfinals with the winners of the 4 vs. 5 series playing the first seed and the winner of the 3 vs. 6 series playing the second seed. In the Quarterfinals the matches were two-game aggregates once more with the victors advancing to the National Semifinals. Beginning with the Semifinals all games were played at the St. Paul Civic Center and all series became Single-game eliminations. The winning teams in the semifinals advanced to the National Championship Game.

Tournament Bracket

Note: * denotes overtime period(s)

First round

(E3) Northeastern vs. (W6) Merrimack

(E4) Harvard vs. (W5) Michigan State

(W3) Wisconsin vs. (E6) Lowell

(W4) Bowling Green vs. (E5) Vermont

Quarterfinals

(E1) Maine vs. (W4) Bowling Green

(E2) St. Lawrence vs. (W3) Wisconsin

(W1) Minnesota vs. (W5) Michigan State

(W2) Lake Superior State vs. (W6) Merrimack

Frozen Four

National Semifinal

(E1) Maine vs. (W2) Lake Superior State

(W1) Minnesota vs. (E2) St. Lawrence

Third-place game

(E1) Maine vs. (W1) Minnesota

National Championship

(W2) Lake Superior State vs. (E2) St. Lawrence

All-Tournament Team
G: Bruce Hoffort* (Lake Superior State)
D: Kord Cernich (Lake Superior State)
D: Brian McColgan (St. Lawrence)
F: Dave Capuano (Maine)
F: Mike de Carle (Lake Superior State)
F: Pete Lappin (St. Lawrence)
* Most Outstanding Player(s)

References

Tournament
NCAA Division I men's ice hockey tournament
March 1988 sports events in the United States
April 1988 sports events in the United States
NCAA Division I Men's Ice Hockey Tournament
NCAA Division I Men's Ice Hockey Tournament
NCAA Division I Men's Ice Hockey Tournament
NCAA Division I Men's Ice Hockey Tournament
NCAA Division I Men's Ice Hockey Tournament
NCAA Division I Men's Ice Hockey Tournament
NCAA Division I Men's Ice Hockey Tournament
NCAA Division I Men's Ice Hockey Tournament
1980s in Minneapolis
History of Madison, Wisconsin
Ice hockey competitions in New York (state)
Ice hockey competitions in Ohio
Ice hockey competitions in Wisconsin
Ice hockey competitions in Boston
Ice hockey competitions in Maine
Ice hockey competitions in Michigan
Ice hockey competitions in Minneapolis
Sports in Lake Placid, New York
Sports in Madison, Wisconsin
Bowling Green, Ohio
St. Lawrence County, New York
Sault Ste. Marie, Michigan
Sports in Orono, Maine